The Charles Gay House, on Gay Road in Waimea, Kauai, Hawaii, was built in 1895.  It has also been known as the Roland Gay Residence.  It was listed on the Hawaiʻi Register of Historic Places and the National Register of Historic Places (NRHP) in 1984; the NRHP listing included three contributing buildings.

References 

Houses on the National Register of Historic Places in Hawaii
Houses completed in 1895
Houses in Kauai County, Hawaii
Protected areas established in 1984
1895 establishments in Hawaii
National Register of Historic Places in Kauai County, Hawaii
Hawaii Register of Historic Places